

NIFL Premiership

NIFL Championship
NIFL Championship

NIFL Premier Intermediate League

League of Ireland Premier Division
 Derry City

Mid-Ulster Football League

Ballymena & Provincial League
Premier Division
 Ballynure Old Boys
 Brantwood
 Chimney Corner
 Desertmartin
 Dunloy
 Killymoon Rangers
 Magherafelt Sky Blues
 Newtowne
 Rathcoole
 Sofia Farm

Northern Ireland Intermediate League
 Ardstraw
 Ballymoney United
 Dungiven Celtic
 Newbuildings United
 Oxford United Stars
 Strabane Athletic
 Trojans

Northern Amateur Football League

North-West Junior League

Derry and District League

Northwest Saturday Morning League

Senior Sunday Morning League

Coleraine and District League

Defunct clubs
Alton United
Belfast Celtic
Derry Celtic
Derry Olympic
Omagh Town
Queen's Island
Ulster
St Elizabeth's
Donard Hospital
Willowfield
Kilroot Rec
Newry City (Refounded as Newry City AFC in 2013)

See also
List of association football competitions
List of association football clubs in the Republic of Ireland
List of association football clubs in Scotland

Northern Ireland
Football clubs
 
Northern Ireland
Football clubs